Monaco was represented by Lise Darly with the song "Tout de moi" in the Eurovision Song Contest 2005. The song was written and composed by Philippe Bosco.

Before Eurovision

Internal selection 
TMC announced in December 2004 that the Monégasque entry for the 2005 Eurovision Song Contest would be selected internally after the broadcaster received proposals from record companies. Twelve female performers were considered by TMC: Anne Varin, Céréna, Cindie, Elise Granier, Élodie Frégé, Ève Angeli, Jessica Marquez, Melissa Mars, Nathalie Fauran, Nolwenn Leroy, Séverine Ferrer and Tigra, before finalising their decision in January 2005. Prince Albert II and Princess Stéphanie of Monaco were also involved in the selection process.

On 12 January 2005, TMC announced that Lise Darly (Elise Granier) was selected as the Monégasque entrant for the Eurovision Song Contest 2005 with the song "Tout de moi". The song was released on 18 March 2005 and formally presented to the public on 22 March 2005 during the SR Sverige programme Diggil-ej, hosted by Kris Boswell. Lise had previously taken part in the Eurovision casting process organized by TMC for the 2004 contest, coming second to the eventual 2004 participant Maryon.

At Eurovision
Because Monaco failed to qualify in 2004, Lise was forced to compete in the semi-final. Here, Lise performed 6th, following Latvia and preceding Israel. She came 24th with 22 points, thus failing to qualify to the Grand Final.

The spokesperson who revealed Monaco's votes for other countries was TMC host Anne Allegrini.

Voting

Points awarded to Monaco

Points awarded by Monaco

References

2005
Countries in the Eurovision Song Contest 2005
Eurovision